The Pondichéry fan-throated lizard (Sitana ponticeriana) is a species of agamid lizard found in eastern peninsular India. It was earlier thought to be widespread but studies in 2016 resulted in the splitting of the group into several species placed in two genera. The genus Sitana has an enlarged projecting scale on the posterior side of the hind thigh which is absent in the sister genus Sarada.

The species is found mostly on the ground in open ground patches in thin forests. When disturbed this lizard sometimes runs with a bipedal gait.

Descriptions

Upper head-scales small, sharply keeled; canthus rostralis and supraciliary edge sharp, with much enlarged scales. Dorsal scales larger than ventrals, with sharp keels forming straight longitudinal lines; lateral scales smallest, uniform or intermixed with scattered enlarged ones. The fore limb does not extend on to the vent, if laid backwards; the hind limb reaches to the orbit, if laid forwards; the lower thigh is rather shorter than the foot (measured from the heel to the tip of the longest toe), the length of which is only three-fourths of the distance between the shoulder and hip joints. Limbs above with uniform strongly keeled scales. The length of the limbs varies very much : in some specimens the hind limb stretched forwards does not extend beyond the orbit, in others it reaches the end of the snout or even considerably beyond. Brown, with a series of dark spots along the middle of the back, the spot on the neck being the darkest; a whitish band along each side of the back. The gular (throat) appendage is tricoloured— black, blue, and red.

Tail round, slender, once and a half to twice as long as the head and body, covered with equal keeled scales. Olive-brown above, with a series of rhomboidal spots along the middle of the back; a more or less distinct light band along each side of the back. Dewlap color in this species is very variable. Typically the gular appendage is tricoloured— black, blue, and red; It is more developed in the breeding-season, and in the majority of individuals, at all events, is not coloured at other times. Males are typically distinguished as coloured-fanned, intermediate-fanned, and white-fanned. 

This species attains a maximum length of 8 inches, of which the tail takes 5 inches. From snout to vent 3-5 inches.
Ebanasar (1989) reported the histomorphology of thyroid gland and thyroid activity in Sitana ponticeriana in juveniles, males and females with different ovary maturation stages. He has also reported ovoviviparity in females from Madurai and Virudhunagar areas of Tamil Nadu.

M. A. Smith noted that there were variants with intermediates that were separated in 2016. Jerdon had described a form from near Bombay called deccanensis which is now included in the genus Sarada.

Distribution
This species occurs in eastern parts of peninsular India, along the Coromandel Coast. It may be distributed in parts of Sri Lanka.

A team of researchers has discovered a new species of colourful fan-throated lizard from coastal areas of Thiruvananthapuram. The new species belonging to the genus Sitana, have been named Sitana attenboroughii after Sir David Frederick Attenborough, veteran broadcaster and naturalist.

References

 Cuvier, G. J. L. N. F. D. 1829 Le Règne Animal Distribué d'après son Organisation, pour servir de base à l'Histoire naturelle des Animaux et d'introduction à l'Anatomie Comparée. Nouvelle Edition. Vol. 2. Les Reptiles. Déterville, Paris, i-xvi, 1-406
 Jerdon, T.C. 1870 Notes on Indian Herpetology. P. Asiatic Soc. Bengal March 1870: 66-85
 Kelaart, Edward Fred 1854 Catalogue of reptiles collected in Ceylon. Ann. Mag. Nat. Hist. (2) 13: 137-140
 Ebanasar J. 1989. Histomorphology of thyroid gland in a ground lizard Sitana ponticeriana. M.Sc. Dissertation submitted to Madurai Kamaraj University.
Ebanasar J. and N.Inbamani 1989. Histomorphology of thyroid gland in a ground lizard Sitana ponticeriana (Cuvier). ANJAC Journal. 9:85-95.

External links
 

Sitana
Reptiles of India
Reptiles of Pakistan
Reptiles of Sri Lanka
Reptiles described in 1929
Taxa named by Georges Cuvier